Georgi Lvovich Tigiyev (born 26 May 1995) is a Russian professional footballer who plays as a left-back.

Club career
Tigiyev made his professional debut on 3 May 2015 for FC Torpedo Moscow in a Russian Football Premier League game against FC Rubin Kazan. In July 2015, he signed for FC Anzhi Makhachkala. He made his league debut for the club on 1 August 2015 in a 1-0 away loss to CSKA Moscow. He was subbed on for Georgi Zotov at halftime. On 24 February 2017, he signed a loan contract with FC Spartak Moscow that ran until 31 May 2017. He made his league debut for the club on 3 April 2017 in a 3–2 home victory over FC Orenburg. He was subbed off in the 56th minute, being replaced by Andrey Yeshchenko. On 13 June 2017, he signed a full long-term contract with Spartak.

On 31 August 2018, he joined PFC Krylia Sovetov Samara on loan for the 2018–19 season. On 28 February 2019, Krylia Sovetov announced he would move on another loan to Belarus at Dinamo Minsk until the summer.

Career statistics

Notes

Club Honours

Spartak Moscow

Russian Premier League: 2016-17
Russian Super Cup: 2017

References

External links
 
 
 

1995 births
Sportspeople from Vladikavkaz
Living people
Ossetian people
Ossetian footballers
Russian footballers
Association football defenders
FC Torpedo Moscow players
Russian Premier League players
FC Anzhi Makhachkala players
Russia under-21 international footballers
FC Spartak Moscow players
PFC Krylia Sovetov Samara players
FC Dinamo Minsk players
Russian expatriate footballers
Expatriate footballers in Belarus
FC Kuban Krasnodar players
FC Spartak-2 Moscow players